Rhodanicaris is an extinct genus of prawn which is preserved in the Callovian la Voulte-sur-Rhône lagerstätte.

References

Penaeidae
Jurassic crustaceans
Monotypic arthropod genera
Fossils of France